Tarakohe, in older sources referred to as Terekohe, is a locality in the Tasman District of New Zealand's upper South Island, located east of Pōhara in Golden Bay.

Demographics

The statistical area had a population of 120 at the 2018 New Zealand census, an increase of 3 people (2.6%) since the 2013 census, and a decrease of 12 people (−9.1%) since the 2006 census. There were 42 households. There were 51 males and 69 females, giving a sex ratio of 0.74 males per female. The median age was 50.6 years (compared with 37.4 years nationally), with 24 people (20.0%) aged under 15 years, 6 (5.0%) aged 15 to 29, 63 (52.5%) aged 30 to 64, and 24 (20.0%) aged 65 or older.

Ethnicities were 92.5% European/Pākehā, 15.0% Māori, and 5.0% other ethnicities (totals add to more than 100% since people could identify with multiple ethnicities).

Although some people objected to giving their religion, 67.5% had no religion, 17.5% were Christian, 2.5% were Buddhist and 7.5% had other religions.

Of those at least 15 years old, 30 (31.2%) people had a bachelor or higher degree, and 9 (9.4%) people had no formal qualifications. The median income was $21,200, compared with $31,800 nationally. The employment status of those at least 15 was that 30 (31.2%) people were employed full-time, 27 (28.1%) were part-time, and 3 (3.1%) were unemployed.

Tarakohe cement

Tarakohe is best known for the manufacture of Portland cement. In 1908, investors from Nelson and Wellington provided the capital to form the Golden Bay Cement Company. The company built a wharf on the coast in 1910 in what became known as Limestone Bay. A post office opened in Tarakohe in July 1910. Production of cement was commenced in November 1911.

One of the 17 deaths caused by the 1929 Murchison earthquake was at the cement works when a cliff face collapsed onto a powerhouse, killing the engineer Arthur Stubbs inside the building.

Cement from Tarakohe was used in the Manapouri Power Station and many of the Think Big projects, e.g. the Clyde Dam. In 1983, the company merged with Wilson's Portland Cement. It came under the ownership of Fletcher Challenge and the 1988 closure of the facility at Tarakohe had a significant economic and employment impact on Golden Bay. In 2001, Fletcher Challenge sold the cement plant and its land.

Port Tarakohe
The Golden Bay Cement Company developed Port Tarakohe in several stages; a concrete wharf was added in 1977. Its primary use was for shipping the company's product and it is also used for shipping dolomite quarried at Mount Burnett. Port Tarakohe was sold for NZ$275,000 to Tasman District Council in 1994. Beginning in 2003, work was undertaken at the port: a new wharf was built, the harbour dredged, the breakwater extended, and the harbour entrance narrowed. The improvements were completed by 2005 and the port has since had 61 berths.

After Cyclone Gita destroyed the road over Tākaka Hill on 20 February 2018 and therefore severed all road access to Golden Bay, Port Tarakohe was used to ferry goods and people to and from Nelson Harbour. In July 2019, Tasman District Council applied for a grant from the government's Provincial Growth Fund, with an expected growth of the aquaculture industry (mostly mussel farming) as its main justification. In September 2020, the government responded by offering a $20m loan.

Abel Tasman Monument
The Abel Tasman Monument is a memorial to the first recorded contact between Europeans—led by the Dutch explorer Abel Tasman—and Māori near present-day Tarakohe on 18 and 19 December 1642. It was unveiled 300 years later on the tercentenary of the encounter by the prime minister, several government ministers, and a Dutch delegation. Originally referred to as the Abel Tasman Memorial and designed by the architect Ernst Plischke, the centrepiece of the monument is a concrete monolith painted white and symbolising a Greek funerary stele. Located on a bluff east of Tarakohe Harbour, the land for the monument was gifted by the Golden Bay Cement Company. The dignitaries opened the Abel Tasman National Park the following day and the area holding the monument is part of the national park, although physically separate from it. As was typical for the 1940s, the original inscription focussed on the European experience only and overlooked the Māori perspective.

References

Populated places in the Tasman District